Pyrotrichus vitticollis is a species of beetle in the family Cerambycidae, the only species in the genus Pyrotrichus.

References

Lepturinae